Larry Darnnell Dorsey (born August 15, 1953) is a former American football player and coach. He played college football at Tennessee State University and then played professionally in the National Football League (NFL) with the San Diego Chargers and Kansas City Chiefs.  Dorsey served as the head football coach at Mississippi Valley State University from 1990 to 1998 and at Prairie View A&M University from 2000 to 2002, compiling a career college football coaching record of 42–81–3.

Playing career

College
Dorsey played for the Tennessee State Tigers as a wide receiver under head coach John Merritt.

Professional
Dorsey was picked in the third round (64th overall) by the San Diego Chargers in the 1976 NFL Draft.  He played for the Charges for two years, then went to the Kansas City Chiefs for his third and final year in the NFL.

Coaching career

Mississippi Valley State
Dorsey was the head football coach at Mississippi Valley State University in Itta Bena, Mississippi from 1990 to the end of the 1998 season.  While at Mississippi Valley State, he accumulated a record of 37–54–3.

Prairie View A&M
Dorsey's next move was to be named the 21st football head coach at Prairie View A&M University in Prairie View, Texas and he held that position for three seasons, from 2000 until 2002.  His record at Prairie View was 5–27.  He resigned after his fifth season.

Greenville Weston High School
In June 2008, Coach Dorsey was selected by the Greenville Public School District in Greenville, Mississippi to become the next head football coach of the Greenville Weston High School Hornets. This is Dorsey's first ever head coaching job on the high school level.

In March 2010, after just two seasons, the Greenville Public School District School Board relieved Coach Dorsey of his coaching duties. Dorsey leftGreenville Weston with a 5–14 record.

Head coaching record

College

References

External links
 NFL.com player page

1953 births
Living people
American football wide receivers
San Diego Chargers players
Kansas City Chiefs players
Mississippi Valley State Delta Devils football coaches
Ole Miss Rebels football coaches
Prairie View A&M Panthers football coaches
Tennessee State Tigers football players
High school football coaches in Mississippi
People from Corinth, Mississippi
Players of American football from Mississippi
African-American coaches of American football
African-American players of American football
20th-century African-American sportspeople
21st-century African-American sportspeople